Vitis coignetiae, called crimson glory vine, is a plant belonging to the genus Vitis that is native to the temperate climes of Asia, where it can be found in the Russian Far East, (Sakhalin); Korea; and Japan (Hokkaido, Honshu, Shikoku). It was described botanically in 1883. It is called meoru in Korean and yama-budo in Japanese.

History
The species name is dedicated to Mr. and Mrs. Coignet who reportedly brought seeds back from their trip to Japan in 1875.

This vine was also reported in 1884 snowy regions of Japan by Henri Degron sent to East Asia to seek wild vines resistant to Phylloxera. Degron sent specimens to a Professor Planchon of Montpellier who named them Vitis coignetiae but did not retain them due to their low resistance to phylloxera. Degron planted a vineyard in Crespières, Île-de-France where one of the vines reached a length of 32.8 meters and a height of 2.8 meter. In the cooler Norman climate the vine produces a bitter wine, rich in color and extract.

Description

The vine is very vigorous, with purple shoots. The deciduous leaves are large (15 to 30 cm in diameter), simple, orbicular, toothed, with deep petiole. First green, they turn red-orange in autumn.

Wild vines can be male, female or hermaphrodite. Clusters are large with small berries and large purple seeds. It is found in the mountainous regions of Japan and up to 1300 m altitude in Korea.

Uses

In East Asia it is grown as an ornamental plant for its crimson autumn foliage; and as an Oriental medicinal plant.

It is a recipient of the Royal Horticultural Society's Award of Garden Merit.

It is used to produce wines in Korea and Japan. These are at first bitter, but softened with the addition of sugar.

Chemistry
The plant contains the stilbenoids ε-viniferin and rhapontigenin.

Gallery

See also
Vitis 'Ornamental Grape', a nonfruiting ornamental grapevine cultivar, also known as 'crimson glory, grown for its autumn foliage

Sources

See also
 List of plants with edible leaves

coignetiae
Garden plants
Plants described in 1883
Flora of Japan
Flora of Korea
Flora of Russia
Korean fruit